Arnaud Mendy (born 10 February 1990) is a former professional footballer who played as a midfielder.

He started his career in France with Rouen, he went on to play professionally for Derby County, Grimsby Town, Tranmere Rovers, Macclesfield Town, Luton Town and Lincoln City. He later moved into non-league football for Whitehawk, Hemel Hempstead Town and Welling United. He also had a spell in the Maltese Premier League with Naxxar Lions. Born in France, he made two appearances for the Guinea-Bissau national team at international level.

Career

FC Rouen
Mendy was born in Évreux, Eure, France. He made his debut for Rouen during the 2007–08 season, making 12 appearances at the age of 17 and scoring three goals, as Rouen missed out on promotion to the Championnat National by three points.

Derby County
Mendy joined English side Derby County from Rouen as an academy player in the close season of 2008, and played for the academy and reserve sides in his first season. He made his first team debut in a pre-season friendly against Stoke City on 1 August 2009, coming on as a substitute four minutes from time and scoring a last minute equaliser for Derby in a 2–2 draw. His competitive debut was in a 3–0 victory over Sheffield Wednesday on 3 October 2009. Two weeks later, Mendy joined Grimsby Town on an initial one-month loan. He made his debut on 17 October 2009 against Rochdale. This game was to be Mendy's only as a Grimsby player, as manager Mike Newell was sacked the next day, and the following week caretaker manager Neil Woods left him out of the eighteen man squad to face AFC Bournemouth. On 29 October, Mendy and fellow loanee Josh Magennis had their loan contracts terminated ahead of schedule. He was due to join Rotherham United on loan until the end of the 2009–10 season on 26 March 2010, but the deal was not completed in time. Mendy stayed at Derby and featured regularly for the club's reserve side, which won the Central League Championship during the 2009–10 season.

Mendy was given the squad number 24 ahead of the 2010–11 season, but moved to Tranmere Rovers on a month's loan on 31 August 2010. He made his debut in a Football League Trophy match against Accrington Stanley before making his first league start in a 1–0 win over Peterborough United, where he scored the winning goal, converting from close range for the first goal of his career in England and earning Rovers their first win of the season.

He returned to Derby at the end of his three-month loan spell and featured in reserve fixtures for the remainder of his time at the club. Having failed to break into Derby's first team, the club announced in May 2011 that Mendy would not be retained past completion of his contract in June 2011.

Macclesfield Town
On 11 July 2011, Mendy joined League Two outfit Macclesfield Town on a one-year contract. On 7 January 2012, Mendy scored a spectacular, back-to-goal volley in a game at home Premier League side Bolton Wanderers in The FA Cup Third Round to make the scoreline 2–1 to Macclesfield. The game eventually finished 2–2, which forced a replay at the Reebok Stadium. Mendy then became a regular in the Macclesfield starting eleven. However, the club was relegated to the Conference Premier in April 2012. Mendy stayed with Macclesfield as they began their first season of non-league football in 15 years.

Luton Town
Mendy joined Macclesfield's divisional rivals Luton Town on loan on 19 October, with the transfer made permanent in January 2013. He made 28 appearances for Luton in all competitions, but was transfer listed by new manager John Still in March 2013 following an unspecified breach of club discipline. Still confirmed that Mendy would not play for the club again. Mendy went on trial in July 2013 with League Two side Portsmouth, but was not offered a contract. Despite Still's earlier proclamation, Mendy started for Luton on 30 November 2013 in a 0–0 FA Trophy draw with Staines Town. He was released from his contract on 27 December 2013.

Lincoln City
On 10 February 2014, following a successful trial period, he signed a contract with Conference Premier side Lincoln City until the end of the 2013–14 season.

Later career
In July 2015, Mendy signed for Brighton-based National League South side Whitehawk, to play once more with ex-Macclesfield manager Steve King. Mendy was sent off in the 25th minute of his debut at Hayes & Yeading and left for Hemel Hempstead Town at the end the season.

On 11 September 2017 he joined Naxxar Lions in the Maltese Premier League. Mendy was released in January 2018 and re-joined his former manager Steve King at Whitehawk.

Career statistics

References

External links

1990 births
Living people
Sportspeople from Évreux
French footballers
French people of Bissau-Guinean descent
Citizens of Guinea-Bissau through descent
Bissau-Guinean footballers
Guinea-Bissau international footballers
Bissau-Guinean expatriate footballers
Bissau-Guinean expatriate sportspeople in England
Expatriate footballers in England

Expatriate footballers in Malta
English Football League players
National League (English football) players
Derby County F.C. players
Grimsby Town F.C. players
Tranmere Rovers F.C. players
Macclesfield Town F.C. players
Luton Town F.C. players
Lincoln City F.C. players
Whitehawk F.C. players
Naxxar Lions F.C. players
Association football midfielders
Footballers from Normandy
French expatriate sportspeople in Malta
French expatriate sportspeople in England
French expatriate footballers